Joseph Chalmers Ewing (June 1, 1875 – April 5, 1965) was an American football and baseball coach. He served as the head football coach at Colorado College from 1900 to 1901 and Baylor University in 1902, compiling a career college football coaching record of 2–4–2.  Ewing was also the first head baseball coach at Baylor, coaching the 1902 season and tallying a mark of 5–9.

Ewing married Louise Woodward Currier on October 29, 1903, in Greeley, Colorado. He later worked as a lawyer in Greeley.

Head coaching record

Football

References

External links
 

1875 births
1965 deaths
Baylor Bears baseball coaches
Baylor Bears football coaches
Chicago Maroons football players
Colorado College Tigers football coaches
Colorado lawyers
People from Gibson City, Illinois
Players of American football from Illinois